The 2015 season was York Region Shooters's 18th season in the Canadian Soccer League. It began on May 10, 2015 and concluded on October 18, 2015. York Region entered the season as reigning CSL champions after producing a perfect season in the previous campaign. After a difficult start to the season York Region managed to recover midway through the season, and secured a postseason berth. In the playoffs the Shooters won the opening match, but failed to successfully defend their championship title following a defeat to Toronto Croatia. While Richard West finished for the third consecutive season as the club's top goalscorer with 23 goals, and subsequently as the league's CSL Golden Boot winner.

Summary 
In the off season significant changes occurred in the team management initially with the arrival of former Ajax A1 manager Bob de Klerk as the club's Technical Director. Team owner Tony De Thomasis replaced Darryl Gomez as head coach, and Carlos Rivas was another addition to the technical staff. The roster selection was partially influenced by the easing of import restrictions decided at the 2015 CSL annual team owners meeting. The Shooters used the opportunity by recruiting more overseas talent with the reliance of the organization's veteran core players.

York Region entered the season with a 21 match undefeated streak, but experienced their first defeat since October, 2013 in the opening match against Toronto Croatia. Initially York Region failed to achieve sufficient results as they only recorded one victory in their opening six matches. After recording a victory over Scarborough SC on June 21, 2015 they managed to produce a nine game undefeated streak. At the conclusion of the regular season they clinched a postseason berth by finishing third in the First Division with the second highest scoring record. In the preliminary round of the playoffs they defeated Burlington SC, but were eliminated in the second round to Toronto Croatia.

In the Second Division their reserve team was under the guidance of Gilbert Amaral, where the team managed to secure a postseason berth by finishing second in the division. Unfortunately the team was eliminated from the competition after recording a loss to Niagara United B in the quarterfinals. Once the season came to a conclusion the organization received two awards at the 2015 annual CSL awards ceremony with striker Richard West winning the CSL Golden Boot, and Cyndy De Thomasis was honored with the Harry Paul Gauss award.

Club

Management

First Division roster
As of June 12, 2015.

Second Division roster 
As of June 22, 2015.

Transfers

In

Competitions summary

Regular season

First division

Results summary

Results by round

Matches

Postseason

Second division

Statistics

Goals and assists 
Correct as of November 2015

References  

York Region Shooters
York Region Shooters
2015